Ebele Okaro Onyiuke (born 19 January 1964) is a Nigerian actress and film producer.

Early life and education
Ebele Okaro was born on 19 January 1964 in London and raised in Enugu, Nigeria. She began acting while attending the Santa Maria Primary School and continued while at Nsukka's Queen of the Holy Rosary Secondary School. Initially she began studies in education at the University of Calabar, Cross River State, but later found out that her passion for the dramatic arts won out and she earned a Bachelor's degree in Theatre Arts. Okaro's mother is a television producer and her father, an engineer who also have great interest in arts and literature.

Career
After graduation from university, Okaro served her National Youth Service at the Nigerian Television Authority, where she made some television appearances. However, after the Youth Service, she worked with an embassy in Lagos and later in a bank before returning to acting in the Nigerian movie industry (known as Nollywood).

In 2014, Okaro produced and acted in Musical Whispers, a movie that advocates for loving care for children with autism. It features other prominent Nigerian actors, most notably Chioma Chukwuka and Kalu Ikeagwu.

She has become known as the "Mama of Nollywood" and has earned the respect of both fans and colleagues.

Personal life
She married into the Onyiuke family.

Awards and nominations

Filmography

References

External links

Living people
University of Calabar alumni
Igbo actresses
1964 births
Nigerian film actresses
Nigerian film producers
Actors from Enugu State
Nigerian women film producers
Nigerian women film directors
21st-century Nigerian actresses
Africa Magic Viewers' Choice Awards winners